Raymond Swann (born 2 October 1950) is a former English cricketer and schoolteacher. Swann was a right-handed batsman who bowled right-arm medium pace. He was born at Stannington, Northumberland.

Swann made his debut in county cricket for Northumberland, in the 1969 Minor Counties Championship against Cheshire.  From 1969 to 1972, he represented the county in seventeen Minor Counties matches, with his final appearance coming against Durham.  In 1971, he also represented the county in a List A match against Lincolnshire in the Gillette Cup.

Seventeen years after his last Minor counties appearance, Swann joined Bedfordshire, making his Minor Counties Championship debut for the county against his former county Northumberland.  From 1989 to 1995, he represented the county in 53 Minor Counties Championship matches, with his final appearance coming against Cambridgeshire. He also represented the county in twelve MCCA Knockout Trophy matches.  He also played a single List A match for Bedfordshire against Worcestershire in the 1991 NatWest Trophy.

Swann's final List A appearance came in the 1999 NatWest Trophy for the Northamptonshire Cricket Board against Wiltshire.  In his total of three List A matches, he scored 37 runs at an average of 12.33, with a high score of 19.  With the ball, he took 2 wickets at a bowling average of 31.00, with best figures of 2/50.

Family and personal life
Swann has two cricketing sons.  His younger son Graeme represented Bedfordshire, Northamptonshire, Nottinghamshire and England and was a Wisden Cricketer of the Year in 2010.  His elder son Alec has also represented Bedfordshire and played first-class cricket for Northamptonshire and Lancashire.  He previously taught P.E. and mathematics at Sponne School, Towcester. He then taught mathematics and geography at Akeley Wood School, Buckinghamshire.

References

External links

1950 births
Living people
Schoolteachers from Northumberland
English cricketers
Northumberland cricketers
Bedfordshire cricketers
Northamptonshire Cricket Board cricketers
People from Stannington, Northumberland
Cricketers from Northumberland